The UCLA Phonological Segment Inventory Database (or UPSID) is a statistical survey of the phoneme inventories in 451 of the world's languages. The database was created by American phonetician Ian Maddieson for the University of California, Los Angeles (UCLA) in 1984 and has been updated several times.

Bibliography

 Maddieson, Ian. (1984). Patterns of sounds. Cambridge studies in speech science and communication. Cambridge: Cambridge University Press.

External links
 Simple interface to UPSID, including the list of languages and searches by selected criteria
 Info on obtaining UPSID information from UCLA

Phonology
Works on linguistic typology
1984 establishments in California
Scientific databases